
The See ministry was the 30th ministry of the New South Wales Government, and was led by the 14th Premier, Sir John See.  The title of Premier was widely used to refer to the Leader of Government, but was not a formal position in the government until 1920. Instead the Premier was appointed to another portfolio, usually Colonial Secretary.

See was elected to the New South Wales Legislative Assembly in 1880 as member for Grafton, serving in the Dibbs and Lyne ministries, prior to assuming leadership of the Progressive Party. 

Under the constitution, ministers in the Legislative Assembly were required to recontest their seats in an election when appointed. Such ministerial by-elections were usually uncontested and on this occasion there were only three new ministers, Robert Fitzgerald, John Kidd and Thomas Waddell and all were re-elected unopposed. Fitzgerald was defeated at the 1901 election for Robertson and was not replaced as Minister of Justice with Bernhard Wise KC, the Attorney General, taking on the additional responsibilities. Hugh Pollock, the secretary of the Attorney General's Department, was appointed as a non-political Solicitor General to assist the Attorney General by taking responsibility for committal proceedings. Pollock's appointment was controversial because he was a public servant and had never practiced as a barrister. Francis Suttor was appointed President of the Legislative Council in 1903 and was replaced in the ministry by Kenneth Mackay.

This was the first occasion in which ministers were appointed to the Executive Council (or cabinet) without responsibility for a department or portfolio. It was initially 2 ministers James Hayes, and Walter Bennett, with John Fegan added in 1903. They were not paid in addition to their allowance as a member of parliament, did not have an "office of profit" and were not required to recontest their seats at a by-election.

The ministry covers the period from 28 March 1901 until 14 June 1904, when failing health and the death of his wife in March 1904 compelled him to retire. See was succeeded by his Progressive Party colleague, Thomas Waddell.

Composition of ministry
The composition of the ministry was announced by Premier See on 28 March 1901 and covers the period up to 14 June 1904.

Ministers were members of the Legislative Assembly unless otherwise noted.

See also

Federation of Australia

Notes

References

 

New South Wales ministries
1904 disestablishments in Australia
1901 establishments in Australia